Nikita Maximovich Starostin (born 13 June 2002) is a Russian-German figure skater who represents Germany internationally. He has competed in the final segment at three ISU Championships – the 2019 World Junior Championships, 2022 European Championships, and 2022 World Championships.

Programs

Competitive highlights 
CS: Challenger Series; JGP: Junior Grand Prix

 For Germany

 For Russia

References

External links 
 
 

2002 births
Living people
German male single skaters
Russian male single skaters
Russian emigrants to Germany
Figure skaters from Saint Petersburg